Dağpazarı Wind Farm is a wind power plant consisting of 13 wind turbines in Dağpazarı in the Taurus Mountains in the Mut district of Mersin Province, southern Turkey. It came online in 2012.

Geography

Technical details
Maximum power output of each of the 13 turbines supplied by Siemens Wind Power is 3 MW and the total annual energy production is about 129 GWh.

See also

 Mut Wind Farm

References

Mut District
Wind farms in Turkey
Energy infrastructure completed in 2012
2012 establishments in Turkey